The following outline offers an overview and guide to LGBT topics.

Sexuality
 Human sexuality
 Sexual diversity
 Gendered sexuality
 Human male sexuality
 Human female sexuality
 Transgender sexuality

 Sexual attraction
 Androphilia and gynephilia
 Attraction to transgender people

 Sexual orientation
States
 Monosexuality
 Homosexuality
 Bisexuality
 Pansexuality
 Asexuality
Subjects
 Ego-dystonic sexual orientation
 Environment and sexual orientation
 Biology and sexual orientation
 Neuroscience and sexual orientation
 Prenatal hormones and sexual orientation
 Handedness and sexual orientation
 Epigenetic theories of homosexuality
 Fraternal birth order and male sexual orientation
 Demographics of sexual orientation
 Timeline of sexual orientation and medicine
 Scales of sexual orientation
 Sexual fluidity
 Bi-curiosity
 Heteroflexibility
 Gray asexuality

 Queer heterosexuality

Identity
 Queer
 Questioning

 Sexual orientation identities
 Non-heterosexual
 Heteroflexible
 Homosexual
 Lesbian
 Gay
 Gay men
 Bisexual
 Pansexual
 Bi-curious
 Asexual

 Gender identity
 Man
 Woman
 Non-binary
 Third gender
 Androgynos
 Akava'ine
 Apwint
 Bakla
 Bugis genders
 Chibados
 Enaree
 Eunuch
 Fa'afafine
 Fakaleitī
 Femminiello
 Galli
 Güevedoce
 Hijra
 Kathoey
 Khanith
 Köçek
 Koekchuch
 Lhamana
 Māhū
 Mak nyah
 Mukhannathun
 Muxe
 Nádleehi
 Nullo
 Rae-rae
 Sipiniq
 Sworn virgin
 Takatāpui
 Travesti
 Tumtum
 Two-spirit
 Winkte

 Gender
 Androgyne
 Cisgender
 Transgender
 Trans men
 Trans women
 Non-binary
 Transsexual

Sex and physiology
 Intersex
 Endosex
 Male
 Female

Romance
 Romantic orientation
 Aromanticism
 Same gender loving

Expression
 Camp
 Coming out
 Passing (gender)
 Cross-dressing
 Drag (clothing)
 Drag king
 Drag queen
 Female queen (drag)
 Transvestism
 Gender roles
 Manhood
 Womanhood
 Gender roles in non-heterosexual communities
 Gender expression
 Masculinity
 Femininity
 Epicenity
 Androgyny
 Homoeroticism
 Effeminacy
 Butch and femme

Practices
 Men who have sex with men
 Women who have sex with women
 Gay sexual practices
 Lesbian sexual practices

Society
 Homosexuality in society
 LGBT adoption
 LGBT parenting
 Same-sex marriage 
 LGBT social movements
 Societal attitudes towards homosexuality

Language 
 Gay male speech
 Gayle language
 IsiNgqumo
 LGBT linguistics
 LGBT linguistic profiling
 LGBT slang
 Polari
 Swardspeak
 Terminology of homosexuality

Culture
 LGBT culture
 LGBT community
 Bi community
 Trans community
 LGBT social movements
 Homophile Movement
 Gay liberation movement
 LGBT student movement
 LGBT symbols
 Gay bar
 Gay icons
 Gay media
 New Queer Cinema
 Gay pride
 Gay village
 Gaydar
 Queer art
 LGBT music
 Queer nationalism
 Pinkwashing (LGBT)

History
 LGBT history
 Bisexual American history
 First homosexual movement
 Gay Liberation
 Gay men in American history
 History of homosexuality
 History of lesbianism
 History of same-sex unions
 Lesbian American history
 Stonewall riots
 Timeline of LGBT history in Britain
 Timeline of LGBT history
 Transgender American history
 Transgender history
 Timeline of transgender history
 Timeline of asexual history

Religion
 Queer theology
 LGBT matters and religion
 LGBT matters and Christianity
 LGBT topics and Islam
 LGBT topics and Judaism
 Hinduism and LGBT topics
 Buddhism and sexual orientation
 Sikhism and sexual orientation
 Homosexuality and religion
 Christianity and homosexuality
 The Bible and homosexuality
 Homosexuality and Taoism
 Transgender people and religion
 Intersex people and religion
 LGBT themes in mythology
 Hindu mythology
 African diasporic mythologies
 Classical European mythology
 Chinese mythology

Rights
 LGBT rights by country or territory
 List of LGBT rights articles by region
 UN declaration on sexual orientation and gender identity
 Yogyakarta Principles
 Declaration of Montreal
 LGBT rights at the United Nations
 Intersex human rights
 Right to sexuality
 Ideology
 Socialism and LGBT rights
 Communism and LGBT rights
 Libertarian perspectives on LGBT rights
 List of LGBT rights organizations

Bibliography
 Lesbian literature
 Gay literature
 Bisexual literature
 Transgender literature
 LGBT themes in comics
 LGBT themes in speculative fiction
 LGBT themes in anime and manga

Lists
 Lists of LGBT people
 LGB people
 Bisexual people
 Sexually fluid people
 Pansexual people
 Transgender people
 Non-binary people
 Intersex people
 Cross-dressers
 LGBT-related films
 LGBT-related webcomics
 LGBT characters in comics
 LGBT characters in film/radio/TV
 List of LGBT-related awards
 LGBT community centers
 LGBT events
 LGBT holidays
 Years in LGBT rights
 LGBT topics in medicine
 List of LGBT-related organizations and conferences
 List of LGBT rights organizations
 List of LGBT organizations that affiliate with political parties
 List of LGBT medical organizations
 List of bisexuality-related organizations

Anti-LGBT topics 

 AIDS stigma, prejudice against people with HIV+ and AIDS
 Anti-homosexual attitudes, societal attitudes against homosexuality

 Anti-LGBT rhetoric, themes, catchphrases, and slogans which have been used to condemn homosexuality or to demean homosexuals
 Homophobic propaganda, propaganda based on negative and homophobia towards homosexual and sometimes other non-heterosexual people

 Discrimination against gay men
 Discrimination against non-binary gender people
 Ego-dystonic sexual orientation, mental disorder of having a sexual orientation or an attraction that is at odds with one's idealized self-image
 Ex-gay movement, people who once identified as homosexual or bisexual, but who no longer assert that identity
 Heteronormativity, lifestyle norms that holds that people fall into distinct and complementary genders with natural roles in life

 Heterosexism, attitudes, bias, and discrimination in favor of heterosexuality or heterosexual people
 Homophobia, antipathy toward homosexual people and (literally) fear of or aversion to them
 Lesbophobia, antipathy toward lesbians
 Biphobia, antipathy toward bisexual people
 Acephobia, antipathy toward asexual people

 LGBT rights opposition, opposition to legal rights for LGBT people. 
 LGBT-free zone

 LGBT stereotypes

 Transphobia, antipathy toward transgender people
 Anti-gender movement, movement which seeks to discredit gender in favor of assigned sex
 Cissexism, bias in favor of people who identify with the gender assigned to them at birth
 TERF, acronym for Trans-exclusionary radical feminism
 Transmisogyny, antipathy toward trans women
 Trans panic defense, a legal strategy in which a defendant claims they acted in a state of violent, temporary insanity

 Violence against LGBT people, violence motivated by sexuality or gender identity
 Gay bashing, verbal or physical abuse against a person who is perceived by the aggressor to be gay, lesbian, or bisexual
 Trans bashing, the act of victimizing a person physically, sexually, or verbally because they are transgender or transsexual
 LGBT erasure
 Lesbian erasure
 Bisexual erasure
 Straightwashing

See also
 List of LGBT-related suicides
 List of transgender-related topics
 Bibliography of works on the United States military and LGBT+ topics
 Gay-friendly
 Healthcare and the LGBT community
 Hermaphrodite
 Homosexuality and psychology
 LGBT youth vulnerability
 LGBTQ psychology
 Mental disorders and gender
 Sex and gender in suicide
 Sexual orientation and suicide
 Suicide among LGBT youth
 Transgender youth

External links 

 
LGBT
LGBT
LGBT-related lists